Viken County Municipality is the democratically elected regional governing administration of Viken county in Norway. The main responsibilities of the county municipality includes the overseeing the county's 21 upper secondary schools, county roadways, public transport, dental care, culture, and cultural heritage. The public transportation in the county is managed by Brakar, Østfold Kollektivtrafikk, and Ruter. Ruter is co-owned with the city of Oslo.

County government
The Viken county council is made up of 87 representatives that are elected every four years. The council essentially acts as a Parliament or legislative body for the county and it meets about six times each year. The council is divided into standing committees and an executive board which meet considerably more often. Both the council and executive board are led by the county mayor.

County council
The party breakdown of the council is as follows:

References

County municipality
County municipalities of Norway
2020 establishments in Norway